This list contains singers and groups who performed in the new jack swing (or swingbeat) style, a hybrid style popular from the mid-1980s into the early 1990s. It developed as many previous music genres did, by combining elements of jazz, R&B, funk and hip hop. The sound of new jack swing comes from the hip hop "swing" beats created by drum machine and hardware samplers

Artists

Paula Abdul
Babyface
Ricky Bell
Michael Bivins
Mary J. Blige
Toni Braxton
Bobby Brown
Tevin Campbell
Jane Child
Ronnie DeVoe
Father MC
Aretha Franklin (What You See Is What You Sweat era)
Dr. Freeze
Doug E. Fresh
Debbie Gibson
Johnny Gill
Jasmine Guy
Aaron Hall
Heavy D
Whitney Houston
Janet Jackson
Michael Jackson
Jimmy Jam and Terry Lewis
Montell Jordan
R. Kelly (early work)
Johnny Kemp
Tara Kemp
Kool Moe Dee
Joey Lawrence
Gerald Levert
MC Hammer
Epic Mazur (90s work)
Brian McKnight (early work)
Jeff Redd
L.A. Reid
Teddy Riley
Diana Ross (Workin' Overtime era)
Raphael Saadiq
Samuelle
Tracie Spencer
Donna Summer (90s work)
Al B. Sure!
Keith Sweat
Tiffany (New Inside era)
Ralph Tresvant
Karyn White
Alyson Williams
Christopher Williams

Groups

After 7
Another Bad Creation
Bell Biv DeVoe
Blackstreet
The Boys
Boyz II Men
C+C Music Factory
Color Me Badd
Guy
Heavy D & the Boyz
Hi-Five
Immature (On Our Worst Behavior era)
Jade
Jodeci
Joe Public
L.A. Boyz
LeVert
M & M
Men at Large
Mint Condition
New Edition
New Kids on the Block
Ol' Skool
P.M. Dawn
Portrait
Public Announcement
Ready for the World
The Rude Boys
Run–D.M.C. (Back from Hell era)
Soul for Real
SWV
Timex Social Club
TLC
Today
Tony! Toni! Toné!
Troop
The Winans (1990s work)
Wreckx-n-Effect

References

Bibliography

 
New jack swing
New jack swing